Alexander Allison (c. 1799–1862) was an American politician. He served as the Mayor of Nashville, Tennessee from 1847 to 1849.

Early life
Allison was born about 1799 in Lifford, County Donegal, Ireland. After immigrating to the United States, he established a successful dry goods business in Nashville.

Career
Allison served as Mayor of Nashville from 1847 to 1849. He was appointed by Governor Neill S. Brown as one of the commissioners to establish a "hospital for the insane" in Nashville, designed by architect Adolphus Heiman. He also served on the building committee of First Presbyterian Church.

Allison owned twelve slaves in Nashville and twenty in Davidson County.

Personal life and death
Allison was married to Madeline T. Alcorn. Their son James Hart Allison died at the Battle of Monterey of 1846 at the age of twenty-two and John Allcorn Allison died of apoplexy at the age of twenty-three. They resided at 9 Summer Place in Nashville, and one of their neighbors was Samuel Morgan. He died on November 3, 1862, and he is buried in the Nashville City Cemetery.

References

1799 births
1862 deaths
Mayors of Nashville, Tennessee
People from Lifford
People from County Donegal
19th-century American politicians
American slave owners